Van-dwelling or vanlife is a lifestyle of living in a vehicle full or part-time. The names are compound words that derive from the fact that it is typically done in a van that has been modified with basic amenities, such as house batteries, solar panels, a bed platform, some form of toilet, sink, and storage space. Some vandwellers live this lifestyle by choice while seeking freedom, self-sufficiency, and mobility without paying for conventional stationary housing, while for others it may be one step from living on the street or in a shelter. In 2020, in the midst of the COVID-19 pandemic, an idealized version has been popularized through social media with the hashtag #vanLife. Although the term vandwelling implies living in a van, many types of vehicles may be used for permanent, mobile living arrangements, including former public buses or school buses ("skoolies"), campervans, recreational vehicles (RVs), travel trailers, motorhomes, sport utility vehicles (SUVs), decommissioned ambulances, and cars.

History
The history of vandwelling goes back to horse-drawn vehicles such as Roma vardo wagons in Europe, and covered Conestoga wagons in the United States. One of the first uses of the term "vandwellers" was in the United Kingdom Showman and Van Dwellers' Protection Association, a guild for travelling show performers formed in 1889. Shortly afterwards in 1901, Albert Bigalow Paine wrote The Van Dwellers, about people living on the verge of poverty having to live a nomadic life in horse-drawn moving vans. After the introduction of motorised vehicles, the modern form of vandwelling began.

Mobile wheeled homes became popular in the US following the Great Depression in the mid-1930s as house trailers first entered mass production. This expanded availability beyond the domain of hobbyists and small-batch builders. A New York Times article in 1936 described "hundreds of thousands of families [who] have packed their possessions into traveling houses, said goodbye to their friends, and taken to the open road." Through 1960, approximately 1.5-2 million Americans acquired house trailers. In the 1960s this trend ended with the development of mobile homes, less expensive but less mobile alternatives to the earlier traveling houses.

Legality

United States
In the US, individuals who lack a permanent address and stable living situation, including vandwellers, are technically considered "homeless". Of the 60,000 homeless people in Los Angeles, approximately 25% were living in a vehicle. 

Many municipalities have laws prohibiting overnight parking and/or sleeping in vehicles. Even in such areas, some retailers in the US such as Walmart, Cracker Barrel and The Home Depot often allow people in RVs and other vehicles to stay in their (private property) parking lots overnight. In Los Angeles, living in a vehicle is prohibited on most streets. The city has municipal codes regarding times and places where someone is authorized to live in a vehicle. Non-profit organizations in a number of California cities sponsor "safe parking" intitiatives, which offer limited facilities and some security in designated parking lots. In the Western United States, the Bureau of Land Management allows vandwellers and other campers to remain in many areas of their vast administration for up to 14 days at a time.

Lifestyle

The vandwelling lifestyle can allow for significant autonomy and a lower cost of living than having a mortgage or lease as in a more traditional living arrangement. Assuming they have the means, vandwellers are free to travel as much or little as they would like. Some vandwellers choose to remain in one general area, and work full-time or attend school while living in their vehicles. Others travel full-time while working remotely via the Internet or finding seasonal or short-term employment opportunities in various locations.

Since vandwelling consists of living in a vehicle with a footprint no larger than a parking space, there is usually little to no space for bathing or doing laundry. Some vandwellers in the US use gym memberships to access showers at establishments such as Planet Fitness. Others rely on campground or truck stop showers, or, when no other options are available, cleaning wipes. For washing clothes they may use a bucket and the van's vibration to agitate the water, or will go to a laundromat or use friends' or family members' washers and dryers.

#vanlife on social media 

Various depictions of the van dwelling lifestyle are presented on YouTube and Instagram, using the hashtag #vanlife — ranging from starkly realistic appraisals to heavily idealistic depictions. 

The hashtag #vanlife was first used and popularized by a photoblogger named Foster Huntington in 2011. Many depictions illustrate idyllic natural scenery, sometimes framed by the open back doors of the van, or with the van prominently visible in the landscape. Others depictions feature spotless, stylized interior views of the living space. The people pictured in the images might be young, attractive and outdoorsy millennials. The depictions are often set in natural areas, particularly in the Western US.

Other notable contributors to the #vanlife movement included the Vanlife Diaries blog and Instagram account. In 2019, the founders of Vanlife Diaries would release a book called vanlife diaries: finding freedom on the open road which pulled content from its blog and Instagram.

During the covid-19 pandemic, some influencers promoted the #vanlife lifestyle as a way to stay safe and avoid illness. The movement attracted many newcomers to the lifestyle including younger and more diverse people than the initial promoters of the lifestyle. 

A less idealized, more stark depiction was presented in the 2021 film, Nomadland.

Vehicle modifications 
Van conversions consist of a wide range of possibilities. A conversion can be as simple as a few personal items thrown in the back, such as a sleeping bag or folding bed along with a few pieces of clothing, while using only the engine battery for power. It escalates all the way up to vans that function like micro-apartments on wheels with complex power setups, a kitchenette, and even simple plumbing. Vehicles like the Volkswagen Westfalia, a regular passenger van, or a cargo van, can be modified for day-to-day living by a professional conversion company. Upscale van conversion can provide most of the amenities of a conventional home including heating, air conditioning, a house battery system, a two-burner stove, a permanent bed, and other conveniences that make the vehicle fit for full-time living. School bus modifications ("skoolies") are also common among vandwellers.

Communication
Since many vandwellers lack a permanent address, they sometimes use mail forwarding services, instead of a simple   post office box, in order to receive packages and other mail. This is beneficial because the forwarder can then send packages to an address which the vandweller can access. Vandwellers often pay their bills and conduct business online through the use of public Wi-Fi, which they can access at libraries or in eateries such as Starbucks.

Employment
Vandwellers will usually work seasonal jobs, ranging from national parks to warehouse jobs. Some vandwellers work only part of the year then use the money earned to travel.

Vandwellers have been known to be digital nomads who work remotely from workplace or have a job that does not require working at location. Some of them are self-employed entrepreneurs, photographers, youtubers, writers or translators, or do arts and handcraft-related work. Their job sometimes can be related to travelling or work done at location wherever they currently are. Some of them work normal day jobs and occasionally travel. Alternatively, some vandwellers have permanent employment at Silicon Valley tech companies and choose to live in a van to both save on high rents and take advantage of generous company perks that include free food, on-site showers, and laundry service.

Notable vandwellers
 Jessica Bruder, American journalist 
 Alex Honnold, American rock climber
 Jewel, American singer-songwriter
 Gabby Petito, American crime victim
 William Shatner, Canadian actor
 Steve Wallis, Canadian YouTuber
 Bob Wells, American vandweller

See also

 Affordable housing
 Alternative housing
 Conversion van
 Friggebod
 Housetrucker
 Mobile home
 Overlanding
 New age travellers
 Optibo
 Recreational vehicles
 Shipping container architecture
 Summer house
 Tiny house movement

References

Further reading
 
 Harris, Heather (5 December 2016). "The Road is My Home:" Reflections on Vandwelling Culture in the United States. DigitalCommons@Kennesaw State University. Retrieved 19 February 2019.

Itinerant living
Recreational vehicles

Homelessness in the United States
Portable buildings and shelters